Bethlehem Academy, also known as B.A., is a private, Roman Catholic high school for grades six through twelve located in Faribault, Minnesota. It is part of the Roman Catholic Archdiocese of Saint Paul and Minneapolis and is sponsored by the Sinsinawa Dominican Congregation of the Most Holy Rosary. Bethlehem Academy is commonly recognized for its volleyball team which has made eleven state tournament appearances since 2002 and won the Class A State Championship title seven times.

Academics
Bethlehem Academy's class offerings include those within the following subjects: English, science, math, social studies, theology, fine arts and industrial technology, physical education/health, and world language. B.A. operates on a semester basis with a weighted and unranked grade point system. Because of Bethlehem Academy's Catholic tradition, the academic curriculum mandates theology classes at every grade level. The class schedule is altered for the all-school weekly Mass day. Its “block” class schedule implements core classes that are held each day with electives held on a rotational basis. 
The school is not required by law to complete state testing but rather implements its own form of standardized testing: the ACT series. Made up of three tests, each completed at different grade levels, the series of testing aims to prepare students for the national college entrance ACT exam and serve as a guide to uncover areas of institutional academic need.

Grading System
A (4.000)
94-100
A- (3.667)
90-93
B+ (3.333)
87-89
B (3.000)
83-86
B- (2.667)
80-82
C+ (2.333)
77-79
C (2.000)
73-76
C- (1.667)
70-72
D+ (1.333)
67-69
D (1.000)
63-66
D- (0.667)
60-62
F (0.000)
59 & below

Athletics
Like the volleyball team, the golf, girls basketball, and football team have also made state tournament appearances. In 2008, the Bethlehem Academy golf team took third place in the Class A State Championships. Those team members included Adam Donahue, Dayne Paro, Jason Knoff, Eric Hagen, Grant Wayland, and Nick Murray. Grant Wayland, who also played in the 2007 golf state championships, earned the Class A State Individual Champion title in 2008.

The girls basketball team made brief appearances at the state tournament in both 1998 and 2013.

Lastly, the varsity football team was back-to-back Section 1A champs in 2012 and 2013. In 2012, they were the Minnesota Class A State Runner up, losing 14-20 to Mahnomen High School in Prep Bowl XXXI. In 2013 they lost to the Mahnomen Indians 19-0 in the State Semifinals. In 2015 the Cardinals won Section 2A and were then defeated by the Goodhue Wildcats in the state quarterfinals. In 2017 the Cardinals won section 2A and were then defeated by the Wabasso Rabbits in the state quarterfinals.

Football
 Section Titles: 2012, 2013, 2015, 2017 
 State Semifinalist: 2013
 State Runner-Up: 2012

Volleyball

The varsity girls volleyball team has made eleven appearances at the Minnesota State High School Volleyball Championship Tournament at the Xcel Energy Center since 2002. The B.A. Cardinals volleyball team was Class A state runner-up in 2002, 2004, 2006, and 2008. They have won the Class A State Championship title in 2003, 2005, 2007, 2009, 2011, 2012, and 2014. Several girls have been named to the All-State team since they have been playing at the state tournament and one, Betty Slinger, was even named Minnesota Ms. Volleyball and Gatorade Player of the Year in 2003. The team has also been awarded for its outstanding academic achievements and player GPA averages. Most recently, in 2014, the Cardinals were awarded the Gold level of the MSHSL Academic Team award with an average GPA of 3.82. The head coach of the team, Franz Boelter, has received many accolades for his coaching achievements. In 2008, Franz was nominated to the Minnesota Volleyball Coaches Association (MNVBCA) Hall of Fame, has received several Minnesota Coach of the Year awards, and has earned a spot on the Win Club 500.

School Song (To the Tune of "We're Loyal to You Illinois")
We're loyal to you, oh B.A.

We're faithful and true, oh B.A.

We'll back you to stand, you're the best in the land, for we think you are grand, oh B.A. - RAH! RAH!

Keep your hand on the ball, Bethlehem.

Oh Yeah

Go fighting ahead and we'll win.

Our team's truth and loyalty will bring us to victory for our Academy!

(proceeding verse not sung at sporting events)

Oh B.A. we'll show them our speed.

A few points is just what we need.

We'll cheer you right through - it's the best we can do, for it's all up to you, oh B.A. - RAH! RAH!

Keep your hand on the ball, Bethlehem.

Go fighting ahead and we'll win.

Our team's truth and loyalty will bring us to victory for our Academy!

RACK 'EM UP, STACK 'EM UP - LET'S GO!

Sports Offered
The following is a list of sports available to the Bethlehem Academy student body. These sports teams are exclusively made up of students from Bethlehem Academy:
Girls Volleyball
Football
Boys Basketball
Girls Basketball
Girls Fastpitch Softball
The following sports are only available to B.A. students through co-op teams with Faribault Public Schools:

 Baseball

Boys Cross-Country Run
Girls Cross-Country Run
Boys Soccer
Girls Soccer
Boys Tennis
Girls Tennis
Boys Swimming & Diving
Girls Swimming & Diving
Boys Hockey
Girls Hockey
Men's Wrestling
Girls Gymnastics
Girls Jazz Dance Team
Girls High Kick Dance Team
Boys Golf
Girls Golf
Cheerleading
Boys Track & Field
Girls Track & Field

Programs

One-to-One Laptop Program
Bethlehem Academy is well known in the Faribault area community for being a leading pioneer in incorporating technology in school curriculum. B.A. provides a personal Apple computer to every student and faculty member. Pre-scheduled usage periods and access limits can be programmed into the laptops by the technology administration department and is offered to parents of middle school students. Access privileges can also be revoked or modified for any student as a probationary condition or disciplinary consequence.
The school also offers multimedia and film classes which utilizes the computer software programs and develop the student's computer skills.

Middle School “School Within a School” 
With its own “middle school team” of teachers who focus on middle school grade level curriculum, Bethlehem Academy's middle school aims to expose students in grades 6-8 to the core academic areas. The middle school core classes are: theology, English, social studies, science and math. All students in the middle school program additionally take music and physical education classes. Upon entering high school, every middle school student will have participated in interdisciplinary projects developed by the “middle school team” faculty members. These projects are designed to apply multiple different areas of academia to the project solution.

College in the Schools (CIS)
In partnership with the University of Minnesota, B.A. students in the 11th and 12th grade have the opportunity to earn college credits by taking college courses taught at Bethlehem Academy by accredited B.A. faculty members; however, students wanting to take these courses must meet certain GPA requirements and pay a course fee, comparably lower to that of the college's tuition rate. Courses offered include a semester long U.S. History course equalling 3 college credits, and yearlong 4 credit courses Essentials of Anatomy and Physiology and Calculus.

Student Activities
Students can participate in a number of extra-curricular activities, clubs, and associations. In addition to the number of sports B.A. students can choose to participate in, students can choose to contribute to the Bethlehem Academy “Star”  newspaper as well as the “Veritas” yearbook by joining each's corresponding editing clubs. They may also participate in the theatre program. Every year, the Bethlehem Academy student body holds elections to vote students onto the two branches of B.A.’s student council. Additionally, Bethlehem Academy offers chapters of Students Against Destructive Decisions (S.A.D.D.), Key Club, and National Honor Society. B.A. also collaborates with the area schools’ extra-curricular programs so students can participate in a wider array of activities.

References

External links
 School Website

Roman Catholic Archdiocese of Saint Paul and Minneapolis
Private middle schools in Minnesota
Catholic secondary schools in Minnesota
Schools in Rice County, Minnesota
Educational institutions established in 1865
Buildings and structures in Faribault, Minnesota
1865 establishments in Minnesota